Payal Rohatgi (born 9 November 1984) is an Indian actress and reality TV performer who appears in Hindi films. She was a contestant in the reality show Bigg Boss in 2008. In 2022, she participated in ALT Balaji's reality television show Lock Upp and emerged as the runner-up.

Early life
Rohatgi was born on 9 November 1984 in Hyderabad and earned a degree in computer engineering and was also a Gujrat Board Topper.

Career 
Rohatgi started her career by being part of the Femina Miss India pageant. She later went on to represent India as Miss India Tourism in Miss Tourism World pageant internationally. There Rohatgi won the title of Supermodel Miss Tourism World.

Rohatgi modeled for various brands, including Amul, Nirma, Nescafe, and Dabur Hair Oil. She gained attention after appearing in a television ad for Cadbury's Temptations Chocolates. Around this time she also appeared in music videos by rock band Silk Route and Indipop artist KK.

In 2002, she did her debut with Yeh Kya Ho Raha Hai?, and in 2006, she appeared in 36 China Town.  In the same year, she was offered an item song in the Madhur Bhandarkar film Corporate. She made a cameo appearance in Ugly Aur Pagli, which was released in August 2008. In mid-September, she appeared opposite Irrfan Khan in Dil Kabaddi. Rohatgi was considered a sex symbol by the Indian media during her early career in films.

Payal Rohatgi made her theatre debut with director and producer Vandana Sajnani's play called Fourplay in 2010.

In September 2013, Rohatgi was featured in Life OK's TV fiction show Hum Ne Li Hai Shapath where she played the supervillain Gong in a special episode of the comic series. In 2014, Rohatgi was part of the National Anthem shot by director Rajeev Walia. In September 2014, Rohatgi made her television debut on the Sony TV show Humsafars. In February 2022, she made a comeback to entertainment industry as she participated in the OTT reality show Lock Upp.

Personal life
Rohatgi is in a relationship with Indian wrestler Sangram Singh since 2011, whom she met on the sets of reality show Survivor India. On 27 February 2014, she got engaged to wrestler Sangram Singh in Ahmedabad. In April 2015, Rohatgi with her fiancé wrestler Sangram Singh were seen in the dance reality show Nach Baliye 7, on Star Plus. They lasted in the show till the seventh final episode. Both of them also did a film together, called Night. 

They were the brand ambassadors of International Human Rights Organisation (IHRO), an Indian NGO from New Delhi,

Controversies 
In 2012, Rohatgi alleged sexual harassment by director Dibakar Banerjee and Anurag Kashyap.

Rohatgi shared fake news and fringe theories multiple times from Twitter account. She was locked from Twitter for a week for "communalising" 2019 Hyderabad gang rape. Twitter handle of Mumbai police blocked Rohatgi in 2019 but later unblocked her when Chief Minister's wife, Amruta Fadnavis, voiced support for her.

During 2018 Kerala floods, Payal Rohatgi claimed that it was wrath of God due to cow slaughter. Her remarks were called as "insensitive" and she was trolled on Twitter due to her remarks.

In July 2019, she also commented on inequality in Islam in Instagram over Zaira Wasim's decision to leave Bollywood. Police complaint against her was lodged at Oshiwara police station in August 2019 over her remarks.

Rohatgi also attacked the 19th century Indian social reformer Raja Ram Mohan Roy as a "traitor" & lackey of British, and accused him of defaming the tradition of Sati. She also glorified the tradition of Sati, saying that women burned themselves alive in order to evade rape by Islamic invaders. Hindol Sengupta and Sanjeev Sanyal presented balanced view of the events over her remarks. Museum Secretary of Raja Ram Mohan Roy Memorial Museum said that Rohatgi seems to know nothing about him.

In June 2019, Rohatgi claimed that maratha ruler Shivaji was born in shudra varna and later moved up in caste hierarchy. NCP leader Jitendra Awhad filed complaint against her in Mumbai and demanded arrest of her over her remarks. She issued a video apology over Twitter.

Rohatgi claimed that Jawaharlal Nehru, first prime minister of India, was not legitimate child of Motilal Nehru but born out of an illicit relationship of Kamala Nehru with another man in Facebook video in October 2019. She also alleged that Motilal Nehru had five wives. Youth Congress leader lodged police complaint against her for insulting the Nehru family. Later, she offered public apology to Priyanka Gandhi and Sonia Gandhi. On 15 December, she was detained by Bundi Police in Ahmedabad due to her remarks on Nehru-Gandhi family. She was later arrested. On 16 December 2019 Court sent her in Judicial custody for 9 days till 24 December 2019. On 17 December she was released on bail.

Rohatgi wrote a series of vulgar tweets about Muslim women participating in Citizenship (Amendment) Bill protests for which Twitter suspended her account for a week in June 2020. Her account was permanently suspended in July 2020. A Metropolitan Magistrate court in Mumbai noted that the tweets prima facie "show disregard against Muslim women and Community" and ordered a technical investigation.

Filmography

Films

Television

Awards

Orations

References

External links

 
 

Living people
Actresses from Hyderabad, India
Indian film actresses
Actresses in Hindi cinema
Gujarati people
21st-century Indian actresses
Actresses in Hindi television
Indian television actresses
Female models from Hyderabad, India
Bigg Boss (Hindi TV series) contestants
1984 births